Hyarotis is a genus of grass skippers in the family Hesperiidae.It is found in the Indomalayan realm

Species
Hyarotis adrastus (Cramer, 1780) - tree flitter
Hyarotis microstrictum (Wood-Mason & de Nicéville, 1887) - brush flitter
Hyarotis stubbsi   Eliot, 1959   Malaya
Hyarotis iadera  (de Nicéville, 1895)   Thailand, Malaya, Borneo, Sumatra, Siberut, Banka, Java, Bali.

Biology 
The larvae feed on Palmae including Calamus, Calamus, Chrysalidocarpus, Phoenix

References

Natural History Museum Lepidoptera genus database
Hyarotis  Moore, 1881 at Markku Savela's Lepidoptera and Some Other Life Forms

Hesperiinae
Hesperiidae genera